Tunas Bangsa School (Indonesian: Sekolah Tunas Bangsa) is a school in Sungai Raya, Great Kubu Regency, near the city of Pontianak, West Kalimantan, Indonesia.

The School is open to Indonesian and expatriate students with the dominant language of instruction being English, Indonesian as second language, and Mandarin as third language.

References

External links

Official site

Schools in West Kalimantan
West Kalimantan
Kubu Raya Regency
International schools in Indonesia
International Baccalaureate schools in Indonesia
Educational institutions established in 1999
1999 establishments in Indonesia